Lue is one of 13 parishes (administrative divisions) in the Colunga municipality, within the province and autonomous community of Asturias, in northern Spain. 

The population is 177 (INE 2007).

Villages
 Castiello
 Llue

References

Parishes in Colunga